Sabir Ali Baloch was the Deputy Chairman of the Senate of Pakistan from 12 March 2012 to 12 March 2015, serving in the Senate from March 2009 to March 2015. He is the member of Pakistan Peoples Party and had been three times Member of the Provincial Assembly of Balochistan. He was appointed as Deputy Chairman of Senate by President Asif Ali Zardari, votes were held on 12 March 2012.

See also
List of Senators of Pakistan

References

Living people
Members of the Senate of Pakistan
Pakistan People's Party politicians
Members of the Provincial Assembly of Balochistan
Baloch people
Year of birth missing (living people)
Deputy chairmen of the Senate of Pakistan